Cryer is a surname. Notable people with the surname include:

Ann Cryer JP (born 1939), British Labour Party politician, Member of Parliament for Keighley from 1997 to 2010
Barry Cryer OBE (1935–2022), British writer and comedian
Bob Cryer (1934–1994), politician in the United Kingdom
David Cryer (born 1936), veteran American stage, television, and film actor and singer
George E. Cryer (1875–1961), American lawyer and politician
Gretchen Cryer (born 1935), American playwright, lyricist and actress
John Cryer (born 1964), English Labour Party politician, Member of Parliament for Leyton and Wanstead since 2010
Jon Cryer (born 1965), American actor, screenwriter, and film producer
Max Cryer MBE (1935–2021), New Zealand television producer, broadcaster, entertainment producer, singer, cabaret performer and author
Rebecca Cryer (1946–2020), Oklahoma attorney, tribal officer and judge
Sherwood Cryer (1927–2009), businessman from Texas
Suzanne Cryer (born 1967), American actress known for her role as Ashley on the ABC sitcom Two Guys and a Girl
Tom Cryer (1949–2012), attorney accused of failing to file U.S. federal income tax returns in a timely fashion

See also 

Crier (surname)

English-language surnames

lv:Cryer